After Love is a 2020 British drama film written and directed by Aleem Khan in his feature-length directorial debut. The film stars Joanna Scanlan as Mary Hussain, a widow who discovers her late husband's secret family.

The film received its world premiere at the 2020 Toronto International Film Festival and had a theatrical release in the United Kingdom on 4 June 2021. The film received positive reviews from critics, with praise for Khan's direction and Scanlan's performance. Both were nominated at the 75th BAFTA awards, with Scanlan winning for best actress.

Plot
Mary Hussain (Joanna Scanlan) and her husband Ahmed (Nasser Memarzia) return home one night only for Ahmed to unexpectedly die. After looking through Ahmed's wallet some time after his funeral, she notices a picture of a woman named Genevieve (Nathalie Richard) whom she has never heard of before. Probing further, she looks at Ahmed's phone and sees multiple text messages he sent to the same woman, with the two of them suggestively discussing meeting up with each other.

Suspicious, Mary takes a ferry across the English Channel to Calais to find Genevieve. After meeting her, Genevieve mistakes Mary for a cleaning lady and invites her inside for work. Genevieve lives with her son Solomon (Talid Ariss), who she appears to be on uneasy terms with, and both of them plan to move away in a few days. They're both unaware that Ahmed has died. Mary hides her true identity and poses as a cleaner so she can learn more information. While at her house, she notices multiple articles of Ahmed's clothing. After walking in on a home movie tape with Genevieve, Ahmed, and Solomon, Mary realizes Genevieve and Solomon were Ahmed's secret family for many years.

One day, Mary sneaks into Genevieve's house to search for more information when Solomon suddenly arrives and sneaks another boy into his room. Mary looks into their room and sees them passionately kissing each other. While leaving, Solomon hears her and catches up to her outside. Mary tells Solomon she was in their house to get her bag and that she won't tell Genevieve what Solomon did. The next day, Mary explains to Solomon that she and Ahmed used to keep their relationship a secret as well when they were younger. At first, they sent letters back and forth, but when Ahmed moved to Pakistan, he sent cassette tapes to Mary.

Later, Mary witnesses an argument between Genevieve and Solomon. Solomon accuses his mother of cheating on Ahmed with several other men and refuses to move away with her as he wants to live with Ahmed instead. When Mary confronts Genevieve about their argument, Genevieve says she was aware that Ahmed had another wife throughout the time she knew him, but continued to see Ahmed anyway. She also learns that Ahmed lied about her as he said Mary was Pakistani and that they never had a child (Ahmed and Mary had a son many years ago who died at four months old). Later, Mary poses as Ahmed and texts Solomon from his phone, where Solomon asks if he can move in with him.

As Genevieve prepares to move away, Mary makes some food for Solomon. When Genevieve walks in, she and Solomon get into another heated argument, culminating with Mary slapping Solomon and Genevieve scolding Mary for hitting him. Later, Mary admits to Genevieve that she's Ahmed's wife and she came to their house to get information. Furious, Genevieve demands to know where Ahmed is. After Solomon walks in the room, Mary says that Ahmed died. Solomon tries to call Ahmed, only for his phone to ring in Mary's handbag, confirming that Mary posed as Ahmed. Genevieve then throws Mary out of her house.

Later, Genevieve, Solomon, and Mary happen to visit Ahmed's grave at the same time (and, in turn, Ahmed's and Mary's son's grave, who's buried next to his father). The three of them then return to Mary's house. Genevieve tells Mary that she was always jealous that Ahmed wouldn't ever leave Mary for her, but was fine with sharing as she believed she had the better half of Ahmed. Shortly after Genevieve leaves the room, Mary hears one of the cassette tapes that Ahmed made for her and walks downstairs to see Genevieve and Solomon listening to it. Solomon initially gives the tape to Mary, but she allows him to keep it instead. The two tearfully embrace. In the final scene, the three of them visit the White Cliffs of Dover and look out at the English Channel.

Cast
Joanna Scanlan as Mary Hussain
Nathalie Richard as Genevieve
Talid Ariss as Solomon
Nasser Memarzia as Ahmed
Sudha Bhuchar as Farzanna
Nisha Chadha as Mina

Release
The film had its premiere at the 2020 Toronto International Film Festival during the Industry Selects program, a film market programme for films seeking commercial distribution. Throughout 2020, After Love was screened at BFI London Film Festival, Rome Film Festival, and Tokyo International Film Festival. The film was theatrically released in the United Kingdom on 4 June 2021.

Reception

Critical reception
On the review aggregator website Rotten Tomatoes, the film holds an approval rating of 93% based on 46 reviews, with an average rating of 7.9/10. The website's consensus reads, "After Love marks an impressively nuanced feature debut for writer-director Aleem Khan -- and a brilliant showcase for Joanna Scanlan's dramatic chops." On Metacritic, the film has a weighted average score of 81 out of 100, based on 14 critics, indicating "universal acclaim".

Accolades

References

External links
 
 
 

2020 films
British drama films
2020s English-language films
2020 directorial debut films
British LGBT-related films
Adultery in films
2020s British films
BAFTA winners (films)